8/4 may refer to:
August 4 (month-day date notation)
April 8 (day-month date notation)